The National Socialist Schoolchildren's League (Nationalsozialistischer Schülerbund), known under the acronyms NSS and more rarely NSSB, was a Nazi Party organisation for primary school pupils providing a student council and child protection system in Germany from 1929 to 1933.

History
The league began roughly around 1927 as the Hitler Jugend-Schülergruppen. It was established as the Nationalsozialistischer Schülerbund by Adrian von Renteln in 1929 by unifying the scattered groups under one authority. 

In 1929, Von Renteln became the leader of the Hitler Youth, an organisation that he would clearly favour and to which he would give increasingly-wider powers. Von Renteln would stay as leader (Reichsführer) of the National Socialist Schoolchildren's League until 16 June 1932.

The NSS targeted small children of school age, who went on to become the harbingers of Nazism.

The National Socialist Schoolchildren's League was merged into the Hitler Youth on 20 May 1933. The event was marked with a youth-group celebration.

References

Abbreviations
Guido Knopp, Hitlers Kinder (de)

National Socialist Schoolchildren's League

1933 disestablishments in Germany
Nazi Party organizations
Child welfare
Youth organizations established in 1929

Education in Nazi Germany